Emil Atlason (born 22 July 1993) is an Icelandic footballer, who currently plays for Stjarnan.

Club career
Emil Atlason began his career with FH but did not make a senior debut for the club. In 2012, he joined KR. In 2015, Emil had loan spells with Preußen Münster and Valur. Emil joined Þróttur Reykjavík in 2016. On 12 May 2016, he suffered a broken leg which ruled him out for the remainder of the season. Emil returned in 2017 and started against Haukar. He scored but Þróttur lost 2–1. He scored again in a 2–1 over ÍR. However, he tore his ACL in the third game of the season against Þor.

Personal life
Emil is the son of former Iceland international player Atli Eðvaldsson and his sister is Iceland international Sif Atladóttir.

Honours 
KR
Winner
 Úrvalsdeild: 2013
 Icelandic Cup: 2012, 2014
 Icelandic Super Cup: 2012, 2014

Runners-up
 Icelandic Super Cup: 2013
 Reykjavik Tournament: 2014

Valur
Winner
 Icelandic Cup: 2015

References
 Emil Atlason í Þrótt, trottur.is, 16 November 2016

External links 
 
 

1993 births
Living people
Emil Atlason
Emil Atlason
Emil Atlason
Emil Atlason
Emil Atlason
SC Preußen Münster players
Emil Atlason
Emil Atlason
Emil Atlason
3. Liga players
Association football forwards
Emil Atlason
Expatriate footballers in Germany
Emil Atlason